Parc Merl (Luxemburgish Märeler Park) is an urban park in Luxembourg City, in southern Luxembourg.

Despite its name, the park is not located in the quarter of Merl, but in Hollerich.  It is bordered by avenue du 10 Septembre (N5) to the north-west, boulevard Pierre Dupong to the south-west, rue de Bragance to the south-east, and avenue Guillaume to the north-east.

Parks in Luxembourg City